Howard Linskey (born 16 May 1967) is a British novelist and former journalist. He is best known for the David Blake crime fiction series. This series and his subsequent crime novels are set in the north east of England. Linskey is also the author of two historical thrillers set during the Second World War.

Early life 
Linskey grew up in Ferryhill, County Durham, England where he attended Ferryhill Comprehensive School. In 1989, he graduated with a degree in history and politics from the University of Huddersfield before working as a barman, catering manager, and marketing manager for a celebrity chef, as well as a variety of sales and account management roles.

In 1993, Linskey completed a postgraduate diploma in journalism after which he worked for several regional newspapers in the North West of England, including the Warrington Guardian. He was also a regular contributor to Newcastle United F.C. fanzine The Mag and was the English Premier League football correspondent for a Malaysian magazine.

Writing career 
Linskey's debut novel, The Drop, was published by No Exit Press in 2011. It is a crime thriller set in Newcastle upon Tyne, England featuring a fictional character, David Blake. The book received favourable reviews and was selected by Peter Millar, writing in the London Times, as one of his top five crime thrillers of 2011. It was later optioned for television by film producer David Barron. The Drop was published in Germany by Droemer Knaur in 2014 as Gangland.

Two further titles followed in what subsequently became known as the David Blake series: The Damage (2012), chosen by the Times as one of its Top Summer Reads; and, The Dead (2013) the final book in the series. Both books broke into the top five Amazon Kindle chart and all three titles in the series were recorded as audio books.

Linskey then embarked on a new series of crime mystery novels, again set in the North East of England, featuring journalists Tom Carney and Helen Norton and police detective Ian Bradshaw. Published by Penguin Books, the series opened with No Name Lane (2015), followed by Behind Dead Eyes (2016), The Search (2017) and The Chosen Ones (2018).

In addition to crime fiction, Linskey has also authored two novels set during the Second World War, Hunting the Hangman (2017), based on the assassination of Reinhard Heydrich, and Ungentlemanly Warfare (2019) relating to an SOE operation in 1943.

TV Series 
Linskey was one of the featured authors in the 2017 CBS Reality television series ‘Written In Blood’. Linskey's episode covered Moors murderer Ian Brady.

Personal life 
Linskey lives in Hertfordshire with his wife Alison and daughter Erin. He is a lifelong supporter of Newcastle United F.C.

Bibliography

References

External links 
 Official Website
 Marjacq Literary Agency

1967 births
Living people
English crime fiction writers
British mystery writers
English thriller writers
21st-century English male writers
People from Ferryhill